The Hyderabad–Bangalore High Speed Rail Corridor is a proposed high-speed rail line connecting India's two southern metros, Hyderabad and Bangalore. When completed, it will be Southern India's second high-speed rail line along with Chennai–Mysuru high-speed rail corridor. It is also said to be an extension of Mumbai-Hyderabad line.

The National Rail Plan (NRP) stated that several major cities of India would connected via high-speed rail by 2051. Extension of Mumbai–Hyderabad line to Bangalore, thus linking Mumbai with Chennai is a part of the plan.

Possible stations
Stations are according to the planned alignment as shown in National Rail Plan's (NRP) High-speed rail line map.

See also
 High-speed rail in India
Mumbai–Hyderabad high-speed rail corridor
Chennai–Mysuru high-speed rail corridor

References

External links
 Preliminary Study 

High-speed railway lines in India
Standard gauge railways in India
Rail transport in Karnataka
Rail transport in Andhra Pradesh
Proposed railway lines in India
Transport in Andhra Pradesh
India–Japan relations
2020 in rail transport
Transport in Bangalore
Transport in Hyderabad, India